BholuWala is a village in Firozpur district, Punjab, India. BholuWala village comes under Ghall Khurd tehsil. The village was came in 18th century from a person who belonged to the Babe K family. However, today BholuWala has changed with people's contribution.

Demographics 
The total population of BholuWala as per census 2011 is 1,112 persons.

References

Firozpur district